M. Ayodele Heath is an American poet, spoken-word performer, and fiction writer.

Life 

Born in Atlanta, M. Ayodele Heath studied electrical engineering at the Georgia Institute of Technology and holds an MFA in Poetry from New England College. He was a two-time Southeastern Regional Poetry Slam Individual Champion (1999, 2000) and a top-10 individual finisher at the National Poetry Slam (1999). His first book of poems, Otherness, was published in 2011 on Brick Road Poetry Press. He is creator of the collaborative poetry form, electronic corpse, and editor of the anthology, Electronic Corpse: Poems from a Digital Salon (Svaha Paradox, 2014).

Awards 
 1999, 2000 Southeastern Regional Poetry Slam Individual Champion
 2001 Emerging Artist grant from the Atlanta Bureau for Cultural Affairs
 2002, 2003 Fellowship, Summer Poetry at Idyllwild
 2005 Fellowship, Caversham Center for Writers & Artists, South Africa
 2007 McEver Visiting Chair in Writing at the Georgia Institute of Technology 
 2009 Dorothy Sargent Rosenberg Poetry Prize  
 2010 Fellowship, Cave Canem Foundation
 2011 RHINO Editors' Prize

Bibliography 

 Electronic Corpse: Poems from a Digital Salon, poems (Svaha Paradox (2014)).
 Otherness, poems (Brick Road Poetry Press, 2011).
 Heath's poetry has appeared in the anthologies Poetry Slam: the Competitive Art of Performance Poetry (Manic D Press, 2000), My South: a People, a Place, a World All Its Own (Rutledge Hill Press, 2005), and The Southern Poetry Anthology, Volume V (Texas Review Press, 2012).
 Heath's poetry has appeared in numerous journals including Callaloo, Chattahoochee Review, Crab Orchard Review, diode Poetry Journal, Eclectic Literary Forum, Mississippi Review, Mythium, New Millennium Writings, New York Quarterly, Open City, and storySouth

Film/Video 

 3-Minute Activists: the Soul of Slam (Mad Mouth Media, Cogitate Productions), feature-length film (2014).
 28 Days of Poetry: Poets Make Black History (Week 1), web video series (2011).
 28 Days of Poetry: Poets Make Black History (Week 2), web video series (2011).
 28 Days of Poetry: Poets Make Black History (Week 3), web video series (2011).
 28 Days of Poetry: Poets Make Black History (Week 4), web video series (2011).

References

External links

VIDEO
 lecture, "Poetry 2.0: Poems for a Digital Age," TEDxPeacthreeSalon

INTERVIEWS
 interview, "Three Questions," Extract(s): a daily dose of lit
 interview, "A Southern Griot and His Craft," State of the ReUnion
 interview, Roswell Neighbor
 interview, RHINO Magazine
 interview, FGTV's Writers in Focus
 interview, In Motion Magazine
 interview, Creative Loafing
 interview, at Business of Words
ARTICLES ABOUT
 review, at Alabama Writers' Forum
 article, Out Loud Poetry, Oakland Writing Project Newsletter
 article, Poetry Slam A Fingersnapping Good Time, The Collegian of Georgia Perimeter College
 article, Spoken Words Ring Out in Fairhope
 article, Spoken Word Event Draws Large Crowd, Jackson Progress-Argus
 article, Review: Anthology Celebrates Georgia Poets, Jackson Progress-Argus
POEMS (TEXT)
 poem, The Tragic Mulatto, at storySouth
 2 Poems, Dusk of the Afrikaner, A Brief History of Okra (Master's Take), at diode Poetry Journal
 poem, Things My Father Gave Me (Which I Never Asked for), at storySouth
 short story, The Gospel According to Queen James, at storySouth
 poem, The Stuttering House Negro Diviner Speaks: Heath Plantation, 1863, at RHINO
 poem, Praise Song for the Marvelous City, at Muzzle Magazine
AUDIO RECORDINGS
 audio poem, Urban Percussions, at Badilisha Poetry Xchange
 audio poem, Urban Percussions, at IndieFeed Performance Poetry
 audio poem, Of Ash & Dust: a Tribute to the Crew of STS-107, Space Shuttle Columbia, at Indiefeed Performance Poetry
 audio poem, Of Ash & Dust: a Tribute to the Crew of STS-107, Space Shuttle Columbia, at The Digital Americana
 audio poem, Praisesong for the Marvelous City, at Fat City Review

African-American poets
Writers from Atlanta
Poets from Georgia (U.S. state)
Living people
1974 births
New England College alumni
21st-century American poets
21st-century African-American writers
20th-century African-American people